is a private university in Shimotsuke, Tochigi, Japan, established in 1972. In 2008 the Gates Foundation awarded $100,000 to Hiroyuki Matsuoka, a medical researcher at the university, to do research on flying syringes.

External links
 website

References

Educational institutions established in 1972
Private universities and colleges in Japan
Universities and colleges in Tochigi Prefecture
Medical schools in Japan
1972 establishments in Japan
Shimotsuke, Tochigi